Kanjiramvila Bhagavathi Temple is a Hindu pilgrim place and also a tourist centre situated in Chathannoor, Kollam, India. Many foreigners visit this temple on the occasion of Gajamela.

References

Hindu temples in Kollam district

Bhagavathi temples in Kerala